AR5, AR 5, or AR-5 can refer to:

ArmaLite AR-5, a .22 caliber bolt-action aircrew survival rifle
Arkansas Highway 5, a designation for three state highways in Arkansas
Arkansas's 5th congressional district, an obsolete district
IPCC Fifth Assessment Report, a 2014 synthesis report produced by the Intergovernmental Panel on Climate Change
, a US Navy repair ship